SIB-1893 is a drug used in scientific research which was one of the first compounds developed that acts as a selective  antagonist for the metabotropic glutamate receptor subtype mGluR5. It has anticonvulsant and neuroprotective effects, and reduces glutamate release. It has also been found to act as a positive allosteric modulator of mGluR4.

References

Pyridines
MGlu5 receptor antagonists
Vinylbenzenes